The Leicestershire and Rutland Wildlife Trust (LRWT) is one of 46 wildlife trusts across the United Kingdom. It manages nature reserves in Leicestershire and Rutland, and was founded in 1956 as the Leicestershire and Rutland Trust for Nature Conservation. As of January 2018, it has over 16,000 members, a staff of about 25 and more than 500 volunteers. It is based in Leicester, and is managed by a Council of Trustees which is elected by the members. It is a charity which covers all aspects of nature conservation, and works to protect wild places and wildlife.

Leicester City Council is a unitary authority, and the rest of the county is administered by Leicestershire County Council at the top level, with seven district councils in the second tier, Blaby, Charnwood, Harborough, Hinckley and Bosworth, Melton, North West Leicestershire and Oadby and Wigston. Rutland is mainly rural, but has two market towns, Oakham, the county town, and Uppingham.

LRWT manages thirty-three reserves covering almost . Nineteen are designated Sites of Special Scientific Interest, two are national nature reserves, one is a Ramsar internationally important wetland site, one is a Special Protection Area under the European Union Directive on the Conservation of Wild Birds, two are Nature Conservation Review sites, three contain Geological Conservation Review sites, one contains a scheduled monument, one is a local nature reserve and two are owned by the National Trust.

Sites

Public access
PP = public access to part of site
YES = public access to the whole or most of the site

Other classifications
GCR = Geological Conservation Review
LNR = Local nature reserve

NCR = Nature Conservation Review
NNR = National nature reserve
NT = National Trust
Ramsar = Ramsar site, an internationally important wetland site
SM = Scheduled monument
SPA = Special Protection Area under the European Union Directive on the Conservation of Wild Birds
SSSI = Site of Special Scientific Interest

See also
List of Sites of Special Scientific Interest in Leicestershire
List of Sites of Special Scientific Interest in Rutland
List of Local Nature Reserves in Leicestershire

Notes

References

External links 
 Leicestershire and Rutland Wildlife Trust website

 
Organisations based in Leicestershire
Nature reserves in Leicestershire
Nature reserves in Rutland
Wildlife Trusts of England
1956 establishments in England